Robert Linwood Wilkins (August 11, 1922 – January 3, 2010) was a shortstop in Major League Baseball who played from  through  for the Philadelphia Athletics. He was born in Denton, North Carolina.

Wilkins attended Catawba College, where he played in the baseball squad along with Vern Benson and Ray Poole. He entered the majors in 1944 with the Athletics, playing for them in part of two seasons as the primarily backup to incumbent shortstop Ed Busch.

In a two-season career, Wilkins was a .257 hitter (46-for-179) in 86 games, including 29 runs, six doubles, seven RBI, two stolen bases, and a .304 on-base percentage.

After that, Wilkins attended Duke University in Durham, North Carolina and graduated from FBI Academy in Quantico, Virginia.

A resident of Shreveport, Louisiana for 60 years, Wilkins also played Minor League Baseball for eleven seasons, four of them with the Shreveport Sports of the Texas League, where he set league records of 159 most consecutive chances without committing an error (1949), and for the most double plays (71) started in a season (1951). He posted a .249 career average in 1017 games.

Wilkins died at the age of 87 following a lengthy illness, and is interred at Greenwood Cemetery in Shreveport.

Sources

Shreveport Times Obituary

External links

1922 births
2010 deaths
Baseball players from North Carolina
Lancaster Red Roses players
Major League Baseball shortstops
People from Denton, North Carolina
Philadelphia Athletics players
Shreveport Sports players
Toronto Maple Leafs (International League) players
Wilmington Blue Rocks (1940–1952) players